The Jonathan Clark House is a historic house located at 13615 N. Cedarburg Rd. in Mequon, Wisconsin. The house was built in 1848 for Jonathan Clark, who migrated to the area from Vermont. The home was built in the Greek Revival style and is built in fieldstone with a limestone front. The house has also been used as a dentist's office.

The house has been opened to the public as a historic house museum.

The house was added to the National Register of Historic Places on June 2, 1982.

External links
 Friends of the Jonathan Clark House

References

Houses on the National Register of Historic Places in Wisconsin
Greek Revival houses in Wisconsin
Houses completed in 1848
Houses in Ozaukee County, Wisconsin
Proposed museums in the United States
Museums in Ozaukee County, Wisconsin
National Register of Historic Places in Ozaukee County, Wisconsin
1848 establishments in Wisconsin